The Chery Tiggo is a series of crossover SUVs produced by the Chinese manufacturer Chery Automobile since 2005 (debuted at the Shanghai Motor Show). The first model, Tiggo 3 was originally named Tiggo and was facelifted in September 2010 with the name changing to Tiggo 3. The slightly larger Tiggo 5 was later launched in November 2013. The second generation of the Chery Tiggo 5 has seen three major events, the first, of a stylistic nature, the front has been completely revised with new optics in the Arrizo 5 family air, a new grille which now incorporates the new brand logo. Second event, that of its integration into the range of the Italian manufacturer DR Motori, which offers it by rebadging it, for the Italian market and therefore for Europe. Third event, an increase in sales to more than 500,000 units since its launch in 2005 to 2017.

Models 
The following Tiggo vehicles are available:
 Tiggo 3 (originally Tiggo)
 Tiggo 3x (called Tiggo 2 in Brazil and Chile)
 Tiggo 5 (called Grand Tiggo In Chile)
 Tiggo 5x (called Tiggo 4 in Chile and Russia)
 Tiggo 7
 Tiggo 8
 Tiggo 9

Gallery

References

External links 

web.archive.org/web/20111017172224/http://cheryinternational.com/Overview.php?id=21 Official website]
iran website

Tiggo series
Chinese brands
Crossover sport utility vehicles
Cars of China